This is a list of players who have played for Toronto FC.

List of players 
Competitive matches only. Players in bold are currently on the team roster. Stats and roster are accurate as of the 2022 season as of October 9, 2022. The all-time roster currently sits at 275 players, including 244 who have played at least one competitive game for Toronto FC.

Notes

Players without matches 

 Manny Aparicio
 Richard Asante
 Brandon Aubrey
 Kyle Bjornethun
 Johan Brunell
 Elbekay Bouchiba
 Júlio César 
 Sergio Camargo
 Dante Campbell
 Tomer Chencinski
 Ben Dragavon
 Kilian Elkinson
 Mehdi Essoussi
 A. J. Gray
 Kevin Guppy
 David Guzman
 Zach Herold
 Stephen Lumley
 Chris Mannella
 Brennan McNicoll
 Christian Nuñez
 Mark Pais
 Boris Pardo
 Caleb Patterson-Sewell
 Adam Pearlman
 Pat Phelan
 Greg Ranjitsingh
 Quillan Roberts
 Rocco Romeo
 Tomás Romero
 Brian Rowe
 Brandon Servania
 Kevin Silva

Notes

Club captains

References

Players
 
Lists of soccer players by club in Canada
Toronto-related lists
Ontario sport-related lists
Association football player non-biographical articles